Daryl Gurney (born 22 March 1986) is a Northern Irish professional darts player who plays in Professional Darts Corporation (PDC) events. Gurney is a winner of two majors, having won the World Grand Prix in 2017 in his native Ireland and the Players Championship Finals in 2018.

Career
Gurney reached the quarter finals of the 2008 Scottish Open, beating Andy Boulton and Alan Soutar before losing to Shaun Greatbatch. He then reached the final of the 2008 WDF Europe Cup, beating Stig Jorgensen in the quarter finals and then beat Fabian Roosenbrand 4–0 in the semi-finals before losing to defending champion Mark Webster 4–0 in the final.

Gurney qualified for the 2009 BDO World Championships, beating former World Masters finalist Jarkko Komula before defeating Belgium's Kim Huybrechts to become the first Northern Irish player to qualify for Lakeside since Mitchell Crooks in 2001. He defeated 14th seed Garry Thompson in the first round to set up a second round encounter with 2007 champion and reigning Masters champion Martin Adams. Gurney levelled the match at one set all and then two sets all before losing 4-2.

The following year, Gurney qualified again, and once more played the 14th seed in the first round, this time the debuting Scott Mitchell. Gurney won the first two sets before Mitchell levelled the match and took a 2–0 lead in the decider, hitting nine out of twelve darts at double. But Gurney eventually prevailed 4–2 with consistent scoring. He once again played Adams in the second round, and was again defeated. Adams went on to win the title.

In June 2012, Gurney won the England Masters, Northern Ireland Open and the Tom Kirby Memorial Trophy. In winning the latter, he earned a spot in the preliminary round of the 2013 PDC World Championship, where he edged out Robert Marijanović 4–3 in legs. Gurney then beat Andy Smith 3–1 in sets in the first round. He lost each of the first three sets in a deciding leg in the second round against Dave Chisnall and outscored him in the 180 count, but was beaten 4–1. In January 2013, Gurney entered Q School in an attempt to win a two-year PDC tour card and was successful on the second day by winning six matches, concluding with a 6–2 victory over Paul Amos. His best result in his debut year on the tour came at the German Darts Championship, where Gurney defeated Colin Lloyd, Ronnie Baxter and Simon Whitlock in reaching the quarter-finals, but his run came to an end when he lost 6–2 against Peter Wright.

2014
Gurney's second quarter-final appearance in the PDC was at a UK Open Qualifier in February 2014 which he reached by eliminating world number one Michael van Gerwen 6–5 with a 146 checkout. He was beaten 6–4 by Andrew Gilding but the performance ensured he qualified for the UK Open itself for the first time and lost 5–4 to Ian White in the second round. Later in the year, Gurney made his debut in the World Grand Prix which he qualified for by being the second highest non-exempt Irish player on the Pro Tour Order of Merit. He came agonosingly close to recording an upset in the first round against Adrian Lewis as in the deciding leg of the final set he missed the bull for a 170 finish and two further darts at double eight to be beaten 3–2 in sets. However, he bounced back later in the week when he won the Tom Kirby Memorial Irish Matchplay title by defeating Radek Szaganski in the final.

2015
Gurney's Irish Matchplay title earned him a place in the preliminary round of the 2015 World Championship and Scott MacKenzie missed one dart to eliminate him 4–0. Instead, Gurney levelled at 3–3 before MacKenzie missed a dart at double 11 to complete a 142 finish which allowed him to step in and seal a 4–3 win. Gurney then lost 3–1 against Ronnie Baxter in the first round. From the last 32 stage of the fifth UK Open Qualifier, Gurney beat Alan Norris, Peter Wright and Dave Chisnall to reach his first PDC semi-final where he was defeated 6–2 by Michael Smith. The performance helped him to enter the UK Open at the third round stage and he thrashed Kevin McDine 9–1 to play John Henderson in the fourth round. Gurney won five legs in a row between 13 and 15 darts to surge 8–7 ahead, before Henderson sent the tie into a deciding leg which he won. His second semi-final came at the 10th Players Championship event and he was eliminated 6–3 by Joe Murnan. Gurney lost 2–0 in sets to Robert Thornton in the first round of the World Grand Prix, but two quarter-final exits saw him play in the Players Championship Finals for the first time. He averaged 101.38 in a 6–2 victory over Kim Huybrechts and then knocked out reigning world champion Gary Anderson 10–4, winning the last six legs in a row, to reach his first major quarter-final. Gurney then advanced to the semi-finals with a 10–5 victory over Benito van de Pas, but from level at 2–2 with Michael van Gerwen, Gurney lost nine successive legs to exit the tournament.

2016
Gurney won the first set of his second round match against Anderson at the 2016 World Championship. He went on to lose 4–1, but missed a dart to win the second set and four to win the third. He averaged 105.18 in getting past Peter Wright 6–4 in the third round of the Dutch Darts Masters and then averaged 106.84 during a 6–4 quarter-final win over Adrian Lewis. Gurney swept into his first PDC final with a 6–1 win over Mensur Suljović, but lost 6–2 to world number one Van Gerwen. He was now Northern Ireland's number two player on the Order of Merit and so he teamed up with Brendan Dolan at the World Cup of Darts and they beat Japan, Ireland and Canada to reach the semi-finals, where they lost both their singles matches against the English pairing of Phil Taylor and Adrian Lewis. Gurney qualified for his first World Matchplay, but was ousted 10–2 by Ian White in the first round. He fared much better at the World Grand Prix, despite having taken a month off due to a broken bone in his throwing hand. He beat Mensur Suljović 2–1 in a deciding leg and Steve West 3–0 to make the quarter-finals, where he lost 3–1 to Dave Chisnall. Gurney was also knocked out in the first round of the European Championship 6–4 by Gerwyn Price and 6–1 by Kim Huybrechts in the second round of the Players Championship Finals.

2017
After breaking into the top 32 on the PDC Order of Merit in 2016, Gurney was a seeded player for the first time at the 2017 World Championship and beat Jermaine Wattimena 3–1 in the first round. He won the first six legs of his second round match with Robert Thornton, but Thornton recovered to move 3–2 up. However, Gurney then took six of the final seven legs to move into the third round for the first time in his career and played Mark Webster. Gurney missed five darts to win 4–2, but held on to take it 4–3 and become the first player from Northern Ireland to reach a PDC World Championship quarter-final. His run ended with a 5–1 defeat to Michael van Gerwen. Comfortable victories over Alex Roy, Mark Webster and Vincent van der Voort saw Gurney advance to the quarter-finals of the UK Open. He then took five successive legs from 7–4 down to Simon Whitlock, but it still went to a deciding leg which Gurney took and dedicated the win to his best friend who died earlier in 2017. In the semi-finals he lost 11–5 to Peter Wright.

Gurney won his first PDC title by overcoming Kim Huybrechts 6–3 in the final of the seventh Players Championship. He got to the final of the eighth event a day later and he came from 4–1 down to level at 5–5 with Joe Cullen, but missed one dart at the bullseye to win. Gurney missed four match darts against Mensur Suljović in the semi-finals of the Gibraltar Darts Trophy.

In July, Gurney was invited to participate in the US Darts Masters as part of the World Series of Darts. He won his first round match against DJ Sayre, which included a 154 checkout, before defeating Peter Wright 8–7 in the quarter-finals on a last leg decider, before coming from 4–1 down to win 7 legs in a row to defeat Gary Anderson 8–4 in the semi-finals, to set up a final with Michael van Gerwen, which despite leading 5–3, he eventually lost 8–6.

World Championship results

BDO
 2009: Second round (lost to Martin Adams 2–4)
 2010: Second round (lost to Martin Adams 1–4)

PDC
 2013: Second round (lost to Dave Chisnall 1–4)
 2015: First round (lost to Ronnie Baxter 1–3)
 2016: Second round (lost to Gary Anderson 1–4)
 2017: Quarter-finals (lost to Michael van Gerwen 1–5)
 2018: Second round (lost to John Henderson 2–4)
 2019: Third round (lost Jamie Lewis 3–4)
 2020: Third round (lost Glen Durrant 2–4)
 2021: Quarter-finals (lost to Gerwyn Price 4–5)
 2022: Third round (lost Rob Cross 3–4)
 2023: Second round (lost to Alan Soutar 0–3)

Career finals

WDF major finals: 1 (1 runner-up)

PDC major finals: 2 (2 titles)

PDC world series finals: 2 (2 runners-up)

Performance timeline

BDO

PDC

PDC European Tour

References

External links

Official website

{{#ifexpr:<21|}}

1986 births
Living people
Darts players from Northern Ireland
Professional Darts Corporation current tour card holders
British Darts Organisation players
Sportspeople from Derry (city)
World Grand Prix (darts) champions
Players Championship Finals champions
PDC World Cup of Darts Northern Irish team